Achyra brasiliensis is a moth in the family Crambidae. It was described by Hahn William Capps in 1967. It is found in São Paulo, Brazil.

References

Moths described in 1967
Moths of South America
Pyraustinae